Mohinder Singh Kaypee, is an Indian politician and member of Indian National Congress.

Early life
Mohinder Singh Kaypee was born into a Dalit family to Darshan Singh Kaypee and Karan Kaur. His father was killed by Khalistani militants in 1992.

He did B.A L.L.B from Panjab University, Chandigarh.

Politics
In 2009, he became Member of Parliament from Jalandhar (Lok Sabha constituency). But in 2014 Parliamentary elections he lost to BJP candidate, Vijay Sampla from Hoshiarpur.
He is a three-terms MLA and served as Minister of State for Sports and Youth in 1992,  Education and Transport in 1995.
He was former president of the Punjab Pradesh Congress Committee (PPCC).
Chairman of the Punjab State Board of Technical Education and Industrial Training.

References

1956 births
Living people
India MPs 2009–2014
Lok Sabha members from Punjab, India
Indian National Congress politicians
People from Jalandhar district
Indian National Congress politicians from Punjab, India